Al Falah University or AFU (Arabic: جامعة الفلاح) is a university in the Al Garhoud neighborhood of Dubai in the Emirate of Dubai.  The institution was established in 2013 and opened its doors for its first batch of students in 2015.  It is currently inactive; the university was put on probation by the Commission for Academic Accreditation (CAA) in the United Arab Emirates in October 2021, and its accreditation and license were revoked around October 2022.

The University had four colleges and academic programs: the College of Business Administration, the College of Law, the College of Mass Communication, and the College of Arts and Humanities.  As of October 2022, the University's website has removed mention of its programs and admissions.

References

External links
 Al Falah University website (Archived version from September 2022)

Educational institutions established in 2015
Universities and colleges in Dubai
Buildings and structures in Dubai
Education in Dubai
2015 establishments in the United Arab Emirates
2022 disestablishments in the United Arab Emirates
Educational institutions disestablished in 2022